The Project 18 is a class of Next Generation Stealth Guided Missile Destroyers (NGD) designed for the Indian Navy. They are projected to be the replacement of the Rajput-class guided-missile destroyers. Recently, the Indian Navy has showcased the design for the destroyer in a promotional video, revealing its planned specifications.The ships have been designed by the Warship Design Bureau (WDB) and a total of 5-10 ships has been planned.

References

Destroyers of India
Indian Navy